Oliver Mack (born June 6, 1957) is a retired American professional basketball player. Born in New York City, he was a 6'3" (1.90 cm) 185 lb (84 kg) shooting guard. He played college basketball at East Carolina University.

Early years
Mack attended William Cullen Bryant High School. He enrolled at San Jacinto Junior College, where he was teammate of future NBA center Alton Lister. He played two seasons, averaging 18.0 and 24.3 points respectively. As a freshman, he was the top scorer of the NJCAA tournament with 110 points in four games. As a sophomore, he led his team to the Championship game, in which they lost to Independence Community College. In both seasons he was included in the ideal quintet of the competition.

In 1977 he transferred to NCAA Division I East Carolina University, where he played two seasons, averaging 22.0 points and 4.3 rebounds per game. As a junior, he finished ranked fourth nationally among the top scorers, with 28.0 points per game, behind only Freeman Williams (Portland State University), Larry Bird (Indiana State University) and Purvis Short (Jackson State University). He also set the school's record for the most points in a game, scoring 47 points against USC Aiken as a senior.

Professional career
Mack was selected by the Los Angeles Lakers in the second round (25th overall) of the 1979 NBA draft. As a rookie, he barely had a chance of play on a team with notable players at his position, such as Magic Johnson and Norm Nixon. He played 27 games, just over 5 minutes in each of them to average 1.9 points. On February 13, he was traded along with two future second rounds draft choices to the Chicago Bulls in exchange for Mark Landsberger.

With the Bulls he gave minutes of rest to Reggie Theus and Ricky Sobers, finishing the season with 8.0 points and 2.1 rebounds per game. In 1980, after playing three games, he was released. Mack was the second-to-last Bulls player to wear the number 23 on their jersey prior to Michael Jordan's arrival on the team in 1984 (Mike Bratz, who played for the Bulls briefly in 1983, was the last player before Jordan). He signed a few weeks later as a free agent with the Dallas Mavericks

The Mavericks coach Dick Motta gave him more playing time as a starter and he responded with his best season as a professional, averaging 10.2 points and 3.7 rebounds per game. In 1981, he was passed on the depth chart by rookie Rolando Blackman. He was cut in December.

Mack played one more season with the Las Vegas Silvers of the Continental Basketball Association, after which he retired.

References

External links
NBA stats @ basketballreference.com
Draft profile @ thedraftreview.com

1957 births
Living people
Albuquerque Silvers players
American men's basketball players
Basketball players from New York City
Chicago Bulls players
Dallas Mavericks players
East Carolina Pirates men's basketball players
La Crosse Catbirds players
Las Vegas Silvers players
Los Angeles Lakers draft picks
Los Angeles Lakers players
Louisville Catbirds players
San Jacinto Central Ravens men's basketball players
Shooting guards
Wisconsin Flyers players